The Yamaha YZF-R3, commonly R3, is a  inline-twin sport bike made by Yamaha since 2015. The R3 and the R25 are the first Yamaha twins with an offset cylinder design.

The YZF-R3 was updated for 2019.

Design 
The Yamaha R3 is an entry level sport motorcycle in the same range as other 250–400 cc motorcycles like the Kawasaki Ninja 300, Honda CBR300R, and KTM 390 series. It has some design similarity to the R25, such as the engine. The engine uses a downdraft induction fuel injection system, and the 10-spoke cast aluminum wheels reduce unsprung weight. The cylinders are all-aluminum. For 2017, the YZF-R3 offers optional ABS. The 2018 Model has dual channel ABS and is EURO IV compliant.

Performance 
The 2015 R3 has a braking distance of 40 meters from 100-0 kph. According to some reviewers, the braking system is not powerful enough to match the engine power, and is also prone to fishtailing under hard braking (non ABS).

References

External links 

 Official website (Europe)

YZF-R3
Sport bikes
Motorcycles introduced in 2015
Motorcycles powered by straight-twin engines